D.400 is an east–west state road in southern Turkey. The  road starts at Datça in the southwest corner of the Anatolian peninsula. The road ends at the Iranian border at Esendere.

D.400 runs through the cities of Marmaris, Fethiye, Antalya, Alanya, Mersin, Adana, Gaziantep, Şanlıurfa, and Hakkâri and links to Road 16 in Iran. Between Nizip and Cizre, D.400 is part of the European route E90.

Itinerary

In the table below the locations between Datça and Esendere are shown.

{| class="wikitable"
|-
!scope="col"|Province
!scope="col"|City
!scope="col"|Distance fromprevious location 
!scope="col"|Distance fromDatça
!scope="col"|Distance fromEsendere
|-
|rowspan=9|Muğla
| Datça
| 0 
| 0 
|2,057
|-
|Bozburun 
| 51 
| 51 
|2,006
|-
| Marmaris
| 18 
| 69 
|1,988
|-
|Muğla 
|27 
|96 
|1,961
|-
|Köyceğiz
|33 
|129 
|1,928
|-
|Ortaca
|18 
|147 
|1,910
|-
|Dalaman 
|5
|152
|1,905
|-
|Fethiye
|43 
|195
|1,862
|-
|
|44
|239 
|1,818
|-
|rowspan=11|Antalya
|Kalkan
|36 
|275 
|1,782
|-
|Kaş
|26 
|301 
|1,756
|-
|Demre
|47 
|348 
|1,609
|-
|Finike
|28 
|376 
|1,681
|-
|Kumluca
|18 
|394 
|1,663
|-
|Kemer
|52 
|446 
|1,611
|-
|Antalya
|42 
|488 
|1,569
|-
|Serik
|42 
|530 
|1,527
|-
|Manavgat
|36 
|566 
|1,491
|-
|Alanya
|60 
|626 
|1,431
|-
|Gazipaşa
|44 
|670 
|1,387
|-
|rowspan=9|Mersin
|Kaledran
|39 
|709
|1,348
|-
|Anamur
|45 
|754 
|1,303
|-
|Bozyazı
|14 
|768 
|1,289
|-
|Aydıncık
|39 
|807 
|1,150
|-
|Yeşilovacık
|44
|851
|1,206
|-
|Silifke
|42 
|893 
|1,164
|-
|Erdemli
|46 
|939 
|1,118
|-
|Mersin
|38 
|977 
|1,080
|-
|Tarsus
|28 
|1,005
|1,053
|-
|rowspan=4|Adana
|-
|Adana
|42 
|1,047 
|1,010
|-
|Misis
|21
|1,068
|989
|-
|Ceyhan
|24 
|1,092
|965
|-
|rowspan=3|Osmaniye
|-
|Osmaniye
|51 
|1,143 
|914
|-
|Bahçe
|30 
|1,173 
|884
|-
|rowspan=4|Gaziantep
|-
|Nurdağı
|21 
|1,194 
|853
|-
|Gaziantep
|62 
|1,256 
|801
|-
|Nizip
|45 
|1,301 
|756
|-
|rowspan=4|Şanlıurfa
|-
|Birecik
|16 
|1,317 
|740
|-
|Şanlıurfa
|80 
|1,397 
|660
|-
|Viranşehir
|91 
|1,488 
|569
|-
|rowspan=3|Mardin
|-
|Kızıltepe
|73 
|1,561 
|496
|-
|Nusaybin
|56 
|1,617 
|440
|-
|rowspan=3|Şırnak
|-
|Cizre
|100 
|1,717 
|340
|-
|Şırnak
|46 
|1,763 
|294
|-
|rowspan=4|Hakkari

|-
|Hakkâri
|183
|1,946 
|111
|-
|Yüksekova
|70 
|2,016 
|41
|-
|Esendere(Iranian border)
|41 
|2,057 
|0

Intersections

References

400
Transport in Muğla Province
Transport in Antalya Province
Transport in Mersin Province
Transport in Adana Province
Transport in Osmaniye Province
Transport in Gaziantep Province
Transport in Şanlıurfa Province
Transport in Mardin Province
Transport in Şırnak Province
Transport in Hakkari Province